Annapolis Area Christian School (AACS) is a private, non-denominational Christian school located in Annapolis and Severn, Maryland, United States. It serves grades K through 12.

It was founded in the Reformed tradition in 1971.

Athletics
Boys' high school sports include basketball, baseball, cross country, American football, golf, Soccer, lacrosse, tennis, volleyball, and wrestling.

Girls' high school sports include basketball, cheerleading, cross country, field hockey, soccer, lacrosse, softball, volleyball and tennis.

All boys' sports participate in the Maryland Interscholastic Athletic Association (MIAA), while all girls' sports participate in the Interscholastic Athletic Association of Maryland (IAAM).

References

External links
 School website

Christianity in Annapolis, Maryland
Christian schools in Maryland
Private K-12 schools in Maryland
Buildings and structures in Annapolis, Maryland
Nondenominational Christian schools in the United States
Schools in Anne Arundel County, Maryland
Severn, Maryland